Thomas Dunstan (born September 29, 1997) is an American water polo player. He was a member of the United States men's national water polo team at the 2016 Summer Olympics. USA Men's National team selected Dunstan as an alternate for the 2022 FINA World Championship.

References

External links
 

1997 births
Living people
American male water polo players
Olympic water polo players of the United States
Water polo players at the 2016 Summer Olympics